The list of those invited to join the Academy of Motion Picture Arts and Sciences as members in 2007.

Actors

Jennifer Aniston
Adriana Barraza
Steve Carell
Daniel Craig
Aaron Eckhart
Chiwetel Ejiofor
William Fichtner
Ryan Gosling
Jackie Earle Haley
Jennifer Hudson
Danny Huston
Eddie Murphy
Christopher Plummer
James Rebhorn
Michael Sheen
Maribel Verdú

Animators

Sharon Calahan - Ratatouille, Finding Nemo
George Griffin - A Little Routine, New Fangled
John Kahrs - Cars, The Incredibles
Torill Kove
Marcy Page - The Danish Poet, Ryan
Troy Saliba - Monster House, Stuart Little 2

Art directors

Hugh Bateup - Superman Returns, The Matrix

At-large

Sam Mercer
Lia Vollack

Casting directors

Lisa Beach - Walk the Line, Wedding Crashers
Leslee Feldman

Cinematographers

Javier Aguirresarobe - The Sea Inside, Talk to Her
Steve Gainer - A Dirty Shame, Mysterious Skin
Michael Goi - How U Like Me Now, Sam and Sarah
Michael Grady - The Dead Girl, Wonderland
Adam Kimmel - Capote, The Ref
Alar Kivilo - The Lake House, A Simple Plan
M. David Mullen
Xavier Perez Grobet - Nacho Libre, Music and Lyrics

Costume designers

Consolata Boyle - The Queen, Angela's Ashes
Nancy Steiner - Little Miss Sunshine, Lost in Translation

Directors

Peter Berg
D. J. Caruso
Antoine Fuqua
Paul Greengrass
Monte Hellman
Simon West

Documentary

Steve James
Nathaniel Kahn
James Longley
Brett Morgen - The Kid Stays in the Picture, On the Ropes
Laura Poitras - My Country, My Country; Flag Wars
Eric Simonson - A Note of Triumph: The Golden Age of Norman Corwin; On Tiptoe: Gentle Steps to Freedom

Executives

Greg Foster
Judd Funk
Adam Goodman
Andrew W. Gumpert
Michael J. Lambert
Yair Landau
David Weil

Film editors

Sandra Adair - A Scanner Darkly, School of Rock
Virginia Katz - Dreamgirls, Gods and Monsters
Saar Klein - The New World, Almost Famous
Richard Pearson - United 93, Rent
Álex Rodríguez - Children of Men, Y Tu Mama Tambien
Christopher Rouse

Live action short films

Borja Cobeaga - Eramos Pocos, La Primera Vez
Javier Fesser
Ari Sandel

Makeup

John E. Jackson - Hollywoodland, Thank You for Smoking
David Marti - Pan's Labyrinth, Hellboy
Montse Ribe - Pan's Labyrinth, Hellboy
Kazuhiro Tsuji - Click, Planet of the Apes (2001)

Music

Carter Burwell
Alexandre Desplat
Javier Navarrete
Gustavo Santaolalla

Producers

Agustin Almodovar - Volver, Talk to Her
Bonnie Arnold
Julia Chasman - Driving Lessons, 25th Hour
Jonathan Glickman - Hitchhiker's Guide to the Galaxy, Rush Hour
Daniel Goldberg - Old School, Stripes
Jack Rapke
Jane Rosenthal

Production designers

Eugenio Caballero
Nathan Crowley - The Prestige, Batman Begins
Nigel Phelps - The Island, Pearl Harbor

Public relations

Kevin Campbell
Jason Cassidy
Frank J. Chiocchi
Sarah Greenberg
Ileen Reich
Jeff Smith
Valerie Van Galder

Sound

Michael J. Benavente - Catch and Release, There's Something About Mary
Linda Folk - The Prestige, The Da Vinci Code
Jessica Gallavan - Apocalypto, Pirates of the Caribbean: The Curse of the Black Pearl
Tim Gomillion - Night at the Museum, Walk the Line
Howard London - Spider-Man 3, The Da Vinci Code
Steven D. Williams - You, Me and Dupree, The Mask
Jim Wright - Black Snake Moan, War of the Worlds (2005)

Visual effects

John Andrew Berton, Jr
Al DiSarro - Paycheck, 2 Fast 2 Furious
Bryan Hirota - Pirates of the Caribbean: Dead Man's Chest, X-Men: The Last Stand
Alan E. Lorimer - Garfield, Dr. Doolittle 2
Christopher Nibley - Herbie: Fully Loaded, The Addams Family
Douglas H. Smith - Dr. Seuss' The Cat in the Hat, Independence Day
Ben Snow - King Kong (2005), Star Wars Episode II: Attack of the Clones 
Eric Swenson - The Life Aquatic, X2
Jon Thum - Superman Returns, The Matrix

Writers

J. J. Abrams
Michael Arndt
Guillermo Arriaga
Florian Henckel von Donnersmarck
Patrick Marber
William Monahan
Peter Morgan
Billy Ray
Erin Cressida Wilson - Fur: An Imaginary Portrait of Diane Arbus, Secretary

Sources

2007
Invitees,2007